MG Alba is the operating name of the Gaelic Media Service. The organisation's remit, under the Communications Act 2003, is to ensure that a wide and diverse range of high quality Gaelic programmes is made available to persons in Scotland. In addition to the former mandate to fund programme production and development, training, audience research and related activities, the new Service was given new powers to make, schedule and commission programmes and the authority to seek a broadcast licence.

The Communications Act specifies that "the functions of the Service shall be to secure that a wide and diverse range of high quality programmes in Gaelic are broadcast or otherwise transmitted so as to be available to persons in Scotland".

MG Alba has offices in Stornoway and Glasgow.

MG Alba has formed a partnership with the BBC to broadcast BBC Alba, Scotland's Gaelic TV channel, which was launched on 19 September 2008.

MG Alba's remit also includes training and development for people working in Gaelic broadcasting. One of its talent development initiatives is FilmG, a Gaelic short film competition whose winners are given opportunity to develop their programme ideas to broadcast standard.

In 2014 and 2015, the value of their programmes broadcast during this period was £11.5 million.

See also
 BBC Alba
 STV (TV channel)
 BBC Scotland

References

External links
 
 FilmG

Television in Scotland
Scottish Gaelic mass media
2003 establishments in Scotland
Organizations established in 2003
BBC Scotland
Television channels and stations established in 2003